Dipendra Bir Bikram Shah Dev (27 June 1971 – 4 June 2001) was the King of Nepal for three days from 1 to 4 June 2001. For the duration of his three day reign he was in a coma after he shot his father, King Birendra, his mother, Queen Aishwarya, his younger brother and sister, and other members of the royal family before turning the gun on himself in an event known as the Nepalese royal massacre.

As the eldest of the three children of King Birendra and Queen Aishwarya, Dipendra was the crown prince. Under the Nepalese constitution, the privy council named Dipendra king upon the death of his father. Upon Dipendra's death, his father's brother Gyanendra became king.

Early life 
Dipendra was born on 27 June 1971 at the Narayanhiti Royal Palace as the eldest child of Birendra, the Crown Prince of Nepal, and Princess Aishwarya. In his family he was known as "CP" and famously as "Dippy" among his friends.

Education
Dipendra received his early education from Kanti Ishwori High School, Kathmandu. Then he went to Budhanilkantha School in Kathmandu. Later, he attended Eton College in the United Kingdom. After Eton, he attended Tri Chandra college affiliated to Tribhuvan University in Nepal and later joined the Military Academy in Kharipati, Nepal. He studied Geography at Tribhuvan University for his master's degree and was all Nepal topper receiving gold medal. He was a PhD student at the same university. He received military training from Academy of Royal Nepalese Gurkha Army, and piloting training from the Civil Aviation Department.

Interests
Dipendra was interested in the fields of social service and had an interest in sports. He used to attend various national and international sports ceremonies where Nepalese players participated. Dipendra became a karateka when he was studying in England and had received black belt at around the age of 20. He was a patron of the National Sports Council and Nepal's Scouts. Dipendra also wrote articles that were published in Nepalese periodicals. His writings were often on the motifs of nationhood and nationality.

Nepalese royal massacre

On 1 June 2001, Dipendra opened fire at a house on the grounds of the Narayanhity Royal Palace, the residence of the Nepalese monarchy, where a party was being held. He shot and killed his father, King Birendra, his mother, Queen Aishwarya, his younger brother and sister and other members of the royal family before shooting himself in the head. Because he had killed most of the line of succession, he became king while in a comatose state from the head wound.

His motive for the murders is unknown, but there are various theories. Dipendra desired to marry Devyani Rana, the daughter of an Indian royal family whom he had met in England, but due to her family's lower caste and her father's political alliances, Dipendra's parents objected; he was told that he would have to give up his claim to the throne in order to marry her. Other theories allege that Dipendra was unhappy with the country's shift from an absolute to a constitutional monarchy, and that too much power had been given away following the 1990 People's Movement.

Much controversy surrounds the circumstances of the massacre, and even today, with the monarchy abolished, many questions remain within Nepal about its cause. Sources of the yet unanswered questions include details such as the apparent lack of security at the event; the absence of Prince Gyanendra, Dipendra's uncle who succeeded him, from the party; the fact that, despite being right-handed, Dipendra's self-inflicted head-wound was located at his left temple; and finally that the subsequent investigation lasted for only two weeks and did not involve any major forensic analysis.

Portrayals
Upendra portrayed the crown prince in the 2002 Indian film Super Star, which was loosely based on the massacre.
Indian actor Ashish Kapoor portrayed the role of Dipendra in the third season of the documentary series Zero Hour, it showed a reconstruction of the massacre taken from surviving eyewitnesses.

Honours
National honours
 Sovereign of the Order of Nepal Pratap Bhaskara
 Sovereign of the Order of Ojaswi Rajanya
 Sovereign of the Order of Nepal Taradisha
 Sovereign of the Order of Tri Shakti Patta
 Sovereign of the Order of Gorkha Dakshina Bahu
 Most Glorious Mahendra Chain
 King Birendra Investiture Medal (24 February 1975)
 Commemorative Silver Jubilee Medal of King Birendra (31 January 1997)

Foreign honours
 : Knight Grand Cross of the Order of the Dannebrog (17 October 1989)
 : Knight Grand Cross Order of Merit of the Federal Republic of Germany (1997)
 : Knight Grand Cordon of the Order of the Chrysanthemum (12/04/2001)

Ancestry

See also
 List of shortest-reigning monarchs
 History of Nepal

References

External links
 Murder and intrigue in Katmandu (World Tibet News Network)

|-

1971 births
2001 suicides
Assassins of heads of state
Familicides
Regicides
Nepalese Hindus
Nepalese monarchs
Nepalese mass murderers
Nepalese spree killers
Murder–suicides in Asia
People educated at Eton College
Shah dynasty
Suicides by firearm in Nepal
Grand Crosses 1st class of the Order of Merit of the Federal Republic of Germany
Grand Crosses of the Order of the Dannebrog
People of the Nepalese Civil War
People from Kathmandu
Hindu monarchs